The ISTAF Indoor Düsseldorf is an indoor track and field meeting which takes place at the PSD Bank Dome in Düsseldorf, Germany. The inaugural edition took place on January 31, 2021.

Meeting Records

Men

Women

References

External links
Official website

Athletics competitions in Germany
Recurring sporting events established in 2021
Sports competitions in Düsseldorf
Annual indoor track and field meetings
2021 establishments in Germany